Chris Mears may refer to:

Chris Mears (baseball) (born 1978), Canadian baseball pitcher
Chris Mears (diver) (born 1993), British diver